Duje Dukan (born 4 December 1991) is a Croatian professional basketball player who plays for the Landstede Hammers of the Dutch BNXT League. He played college basketball for the University of Wisconsin–Madison.

Early life
Dukan was born in Split, Croatia, but moved to the United States when he was 10 months old. He grew up in Deerfield, Illinois and attended Deerfield High School. During the 1990s, Dukan was a ball boy for the Chicago Bulls at the United Center. He later played college basketball for the University of Wisconsin.

Professional career

Sacramento Kings (2015–2016)
After going undrafted in the 2015 NBA draft, Dukan joined the Sacramento Kings for the 2015 NBA Summer League. On 22 July 2015, he signed with the Kings. On 13 November 2015, he made his professional debut with the Reno Bighorns in a 123–121 loss to the Los Angeles D-Fenders, scoring 14 points in 34 minutes of action as a starter. During his rookie season, he received multiple assignments to the Bighorns, the Kings' D-League affiliate. In the Kings' season finale on 13 April 2016, he made his long-awaited NBA debut. In 24 minutes off the bench, he recorded six points, four rebounds, one assist and one steal in a 116–81 loss to the Houston Rockets. On 4 July 2016, he was waived by the Kings.

Cedevita Zagreb (2016–2017)
On 3 August 2016, Dukan signed a three-year deal with the Croatian team Cedevita Zagreb. Dukan left the team in January, 2017 in a mutual termination of his contract.

Windy City Bulls (2017–2018)
On January 27, 2017, Windy City Bulls of the NBA Development League acquired Dukan from the Austin Spurs.

Fort Wayne Mad Ants (2018)
On February 12, 2018, Dukan was traded by the Windy City Bulls to the Fort Wayne Mad Ants along with the returning player rights to Henry Sims in exchange for C.J. Fair.

2018–19 season
On August 22, 2018, Dukan was selected by the Capital City Go-Go of the G League in the 2018 expansion draft. However, he was not added to their training camp roster. Instead, he was added to the Westchester Knicks training camp roster but did not make the final roster. Dukan ultimately landed with the Oklahoma City Blue in November, but was waived after three games. He signed with the Capital City Go-Go in January 2019.

2019–20 season
On July 19, 2019, Dukan signed a one-year deal with Spanish club Movistar Estudiantes. He averaged 4.7 points and 1.8 rebounds per game in ACB play.

2020–21 season
On August 8, 2020, Dukan signed with TAU Castelló of the LEB Oro. He averaged 6.9 points and 2.4 rebounds per game.

2021–22 season
On October 5, 2021, Dukan signed with Cáceres Ciudad del Baloncesto of the Spanish LEB Oro.

2022–23 season 
On November 23, 2022, Dukan joined Dutch team Landstede Hammers of the BNXT League, where he replaced Ryan Davis.

Personal life
His father, Ivica Dukan, played basketball professionally in Europe for 15 years and is now an international basketball scout for the Chicago Bulls.

NBA career statistics

Regular season

|-
| style="text-align:left;"| 
| style="text-align:left;"| Sacramento
| 1 || 0 || 24.0 || .200 || .400 || .000 || 4.0 || 1.0 || 1.0 || .0 || 6.0
|-
| style="text-align:center;" colspan="2"| Career
| 1 || 0 || 24.0 || .200 || .400 || .000 || 4.0 || 1.0 || 1.0 || .0 || 6.0

See also
 List of European basketball players in the United States

References

External links

Wisconsin Badgers bio
FIBA profile

1991 births
Living people
AB Castelló players
American expatriate basketball people in Spain
American men's basketball players
Capital City Go-Go players
CB Estudiantes players
Croatian expatriate basketball people in Spain
Croatian expatriate basketball people in the Netherlands
Croatian men's basketball players
Fort Wayne Mad Ants players
KK Cedevita players
Landstede Hammers players
Liga ACB players
National Basketball Association players from Croatia
Oklahoma City Blue players
Power forwards (basketball)
Reno Bighorns players
Sacramento Kings players
Undrafted National Basketball Association players
Windy City Bulls players
Wisconsin Badgers men's basketball players
American expatriate basketball people in the Netherlands
Sportspeople from Lake County, Illinois
Basketball players from Illinois
Basketball players from Split, Croatia